Alcaraz is a municipality in Spain. 

Alcaraz may also refer to:

 Alcaraz (surname), includes a list of people with the name
 Alcaraz rug, Spanish rug design
 Alcaraz Palace, ancient palace in Persia, built around 2000 BC
 Villa Alcaraz, village and municipality in Entre Ríos Province in northeastern Argentina
 Sierra de Alcaraz, mountain range in southeast Spain

See also
Alcatraz (disambiguation)